Caniço is a parish in the municipality of Santa Cruz in the Madeira Islands. It was elevated to city status in 2005. The population in 2011 was 23,368, in an area of 11.99 km2. Caniço is connected to the urban sprawl of Funchal and is larger than the seat of the municipality. It is located 6 km east of Funchal.

On 17 April 2019, a tour bus crashed on a road near Caniço, killing 29 people.

See also
  The "sacred heart" statue in Caniço is by Pierre Charles Lenoir

References

Freguesias of Santa Cruz, Madeira